Five by Five is the EP for the Verve's 1997 album Urban Hymns. The EP was released in June 1997, over three months before the actual album was released. Of these five tracks, only one was to be a single ("Lucky Man"); but all of them appeared on the album. The CD version was issued in a full jewel case picture sleeve. The band picture on the front cover of the EP was used in the second page of the Urban Hymns sleeve booklet.

Track listing
"Come On" – 6:28
"The Rolling People" – 7:01
"Lucky Man" (Radio edit) – 4:25
"Catching the Butterfly" – 6:26
"Space and Time" – 5:35
 

1997 EPs
The Verve albums
Albums produced by Youth (musician)
Hut Records EPs